Michael or Mike Schneider may refer to:
 Michael Schneider (composer), Swiss composer and musicologist
 Michael Schneider (conductor) (born 1953), German recorder player, flautist, and conductor
 Michael Schneider (Jewish activist), secretary-general of the World Jewish Congress
 Michael A. Schneider (born 1950), American politician from Nevada
 Michael H. Schneider Sr. (born 1943), U.S. federal judge
  (born 1967), Austrian artist and teacher
  (1909–1994), German organist and teacher
 Mike Schneider (news anchor) (born 1952), American television personality
 Mike Schneider (poker player) (born 1983), American professional poker player
 Mike Schneider (born 1979), American musician, leader of the Mike Schneider Polka Band